Marshall Monroe Klevenow (March 18, 1901 – November 4, 1976) was an American football and baseball coach.  He served as the head football coach at Middlebury College from 1925 to 1927, compiling a record of 7–13–1.

Klevenow grew up in Milwaukee and attended South Division High School. He attended Middlebury College where he played baseball and football. He played at the fullback position and was captain of Middlebury's 1924 team. He graduated in 1925 and was immediately hired as the school's football and baseball coach.

In early 1928, Klevenow resigned his posts at Middlebury and was hired as the head football coach at Lawrence College.

Head coaching record

References

External links
 

1901 births
1976 deaths
American football fullbacks
Baseball second basemen
Middlebury Panthers baseball coaches
Middlebury Panthers baseball players
Middlebury Panthers football coaches
Middlebury Panthers football players
Coaches of American football from Wisconsin
Players of American football from Milwaukee
Baseball coaches from Wisconsin
Baseball players from Milwaukee